Ingvald Johan Bjerke (March 13, 1907 – January 1, 1990) was a Norwegian boxer who competed in the 1928 Summer Olympics.

He was born in Ullensaker and died in Hundorp, but represented the club Oslo AK. In 1928 he was eliminated in the first round of the bantamweight class after losing his fight to the upcoming silver medalist John Daley.

References

1907 births
1990 deaths
Bantamweight boxers
Olympic boxers of Norway
Boxers at the 1928 Summer Olympics
Norwegian male boxers
20th-century Norwegian people